Eric Stephen Barnes (1924–2000), was an Australian pure mathematician. He was awarded the Thomas Ranken Lyle Medal in 1959, and was (Sir Thomas) Elder Professor of Mathematics at the University of Adelaide. He was elected a Fellow of the Australian Academy of Science in 1954.

He was born in Cardiff, Wales, 16 January 1924 and died 16 October 2000 in Adelaide, South Australia. He was educated at the Universities of Sydney and Cambridge. He held appointments as a Fellow of Trinity College, Cambridge 1950–1954; assistant lecturer, Cambridge 1951–1953; reader in pure mathematics, University of Sydney 1953–1958; Elder Professor of Mathematics, University of Adelaide 1959–1974; Secretary (Physical Sciences) Australian Academy of Science 1972–1976; Deputy Vice-chancellor University of Adelaide 1975–1980; Professor of Pure Mathematics University of Adelaide 1981–1983.

References

1924 births
2000 deaths
Fellows of the Australian Academy of Science
Australian mathematicians
University of Sydney alumni
Alumni of the University of Cambridge
Scientists from Cardiff